The 1927 College Football All-America team is composed of college football players who were selected as All-Americans by various organizations and writers that chose College Football All-America Teams in 1927. The seven selectors recognized by the NCAA as "official" for the 1927 season are (1) Collier's Weekly, as selected by Grantland Rice with cooperation from ten coaches, (2) the Associated Press, (3) the United Press, selected based on consensus among UP newspapers throughout the country and prominent football coaches, (4) the All-America Board, (5) the International News Service (INS), (6) the Newspaper Enterprise Association (NEA), and (7) the North American Newspaper Alliance (NANA).

Consensus All-Americans
Following the death of Walter Camp in 1925, there was a proliferation of All-American teams in the late 1920s. For the year 1927, the NCAA recognizes seven published All-American teams as "official" designations for purposes of its consensus determinations. The following chart identifies the NCAA-recognized consensus All-Americans and displays which first-team designations they received.  Michigan end Bennie Oosterbaan and Pittsburgh halfback Gibby Welch were the only players to be unanimously selected by all seven selectors as first-team All-Americans.

All-American selections for 1927

Ends
 Bennie Oosterbaan, Michigan (CFHOF) (AAB; AP-1; UP-1; COL-1; INS-1; NEA; NANA; CP-1; CEP-1; HE-1; NYS-1; BE-1; LP-1; WE-1)
 Tom Nash, Georgia (AAB; AP-3; UP-3; COL-1; INS-1; NANA; CEP-3; HE-1; BE-3; LP-1; WE-1)
 Ivey Shiver, Georgia (AP-1; UP-1; NEA; CP-2; HE-2; INS-3; NYS-1; BE-1; LP-2)
 Dwight Fishwick, Yale (CP-1; WE-3)
 George Cole, Dartmouth (AP-2; CEP-3; HE-3; INS-2)
 Rags Matthews, TCU (CFHOF) (AP-2; INS-2; NYS-2; BE-3)
 Irvine Phillips, California (AP-3; CP-2)
 Stewart Scott, Yale (UP-2; BE-2)
 Charles Born, Army (UP-2; CEP-1; HE-2; INS-3; NYS-2; BE-2)
 Charlie Moeser, Princeton (HE-3; LP-2; WE-2)
 Matthews, SMU (CEP-2)
 Lou Jennings, Centenary (CEP-2)
 Joe Donchess, Pittsburgh  (CFHOF) (WE-2)
 Charles Walsh, Notre Dame (UP-3)
 Ted Fleck, Kansas Aggies (WE-3)

Tackles
 Jesse Hibbs, USC (AAB; AP-2; UP-1; INS-1; NANA; CP-1; CEP-2; HE-1; NYS-1; BE-2; LP-1; WE-1)
 Ed Hake, Penn (AP-1; UP-1; NANA; CP-2; CEP-3; HE-2; BE-3)
 Bud Sprague, Army (CFHOF) (AP-1; UP-2; INS-1; CP-1; HE-1)
 Bill Kern, Pittsburgh (INS-2; NEA; HE-2; NYS-2; BE-1)
 John Smith, Penn (AP-2; COL-1; LP-2; INS-3; WE-2)
 Leo Raskowski, Ohio State (AP-3; COL-1; NEA; HE-3; BE-1; CEP-1; LP-1; WE-1)
 Fred Pickhard, Alabama (UP-2; CP-2)
 Leo Nowack, Illinois (AP-3)
 George Perry, Army (LP-2; NYS-1; BE-2)
 Jap Douds, Washington & Jefferson (BE-3; CEP-1; HE-3; INS-2)
 Sidney Quarrier, Yale (AAB; UP-3; CEP-2; WE-2)
 James J. Fitzgerald, Tufts (UP-3)
 Alton C. Sprott, Texas A&M (INS-3; NYS-2; BE-3 [g])
 Roy Randells, Nebraska (CEP-3)
 Fritz Coultrin, California (WE-3)
 Francis E. Lucas, Missouri (WE-3)

Guards
 Bill Webster, Yale (AAB; AP-1; UP-2; INS-1; NEA; NANA; CP-1; CEP-1; HE-1; NYS-1; BE-1; LP-1; WE-1)
 John "Clipper" Smith, Notre Dame (CFHOF) (AAB; AP-1; UP-1; COL-1; INS-1; NEA; CP-1; CEP-2; HE-1; NYS-1; BE-1; WE-1)
 Russ Crane, Illinois (COL-1; LP-2)
 Ray Baer, Michigan (AP-2; UP-2; CP-2; HE-2; INS-2; BE-2; WE-2)
 John Barnhill, Tennessee (AP-2)
 Harold Hanson, Minnesota (AP-3; UP-1; NANA; CP-2; CEP-1; HE-2; INS-3; NYS-2; BE-2; LP-1; WE-3)
 Gene Smith, Georgia (AP-3)
 William Wright, Washington (INS-2; NYS-2; BE-3; LP-2)
 John Roberts, Pittsburgh (WE-2)
 Justin Whitlock Dart, Northwestern (UP-3)
 R. Van I. Miller, Amherst (UP-3)
 Danny McMullen,  Nebraska (INS-3)
 J. M. French, Princeton (HE-3)
 Seraphim Post, Stanford (HE-3)
 Raleigh Drennon, Georgia Tech (CEP-2; WE-3)
 Robert N. Miller, Missouri (CEP-3)
 E. G. Blake, Princeton (CEP-3)

Centers
 Larry Bettencourt, St. Mary's (CFHOF) (AAB; AP-1; INS-1; CP-2; HE-1; NYS-1; BE-2; LP-2; WE-1)
 John Charlesworth, Yale (UP-1; COL-1; NEA; CP-1; HE-2; BE-1)
 Claude Grigsby, Georgetown (AP-2; HE-3)
 Ken Rouse, Chicago (AP-3; UP-3; WE-2)
 Robert Reitsch, Illinois (NANA; CEP-2; INS-3; NYS-2; BE-3; LP-1; WE-3)
 Charles Howe, Princeton (CEP-1)
 John McCreery, Stanford (UP-2)
 Elvin Butcher, Tennessee (CEP-3; INS-2)

Quarterbacks
 Morley Drury, USC (CFHOF) (AAB; AP-1 [hb]; UP-1; COL-1; INS-1 [hb]; NEA; CP-1; CEP-1; HE-1; NYS-1; BE-1; LP-1; WE-1)
 Bill Spears, Vanderbilt (CFHOF) (AP-1; UP-2; INS-1; NANA; CP-2; CEP-2; HE-3; LP-2; WE-2)
 Harold Almquist, Minnesota (AP-3)
 Jack Connor, NYU (HE-2; INS-2; NYS-2; BE-2; LP-2)
 Gerald Mann, SMU (CFHOF) (BE-3)
 Frederick M. Ellis, Tufts (CEP-3)
Dominic E. Engbarth, Texas

Halfbacks
 Gibby Welch, Pittsburgh (AAB; AP-1; UP-1; COL-1; INS-1; NEA; NANA; CP-1; CEP-1; HE-1; NYS-1; BE-1; LP-1; WE-1)
 Red Cagle, Army (CFHOF) (AAB; AP-3; UP-3; COL-1; NANA; CEP-3; HE-2; WE-1)
 Christie Flanagan, Notre Dame (UP-1; NEA; CP-1; HE-3; INS-3; BE-1)
 Alton Marsters, Dartmouth (AP-2; UP-2; HE-3; INS-2; NYS-2; BE-2; CEP-1; LP-2; WE-2)
 Glenn Presnell, Nebraska (AP-2; UP-2; HE-2; INS-2; NYS-2; BE-2; CEP-2; LP-1; WE-2)
 Joel Hunt, Texas A&M  (CFHOF) (AP-2 [qb]; INS-3 [qb]; BE-3; CEP-2; LP-2; WE-3 [qb])
 Chuck Carroll, Washington (CFHOF) (AP-3)
 Louis Gilbert, Michigan (UP-3 [qb]; CP-2; BE-3; WE-3)
 Walter "Swede" Gebert, Marquette (UP-3; INS-3; LP-2)
 Bruce Caldwell, Yale (CP-2; HE-1; NYS-1; LP-2)
 Bob Nork, Georgetown (CEP-3)
 Johnny Roepke, Penn State (WE-3)

Fullbacks
 Herb Joesting, Minnesota (CFHOF) (AAB; AP-1; UP-1; COL-1; INS-1; NEA; CP-1; CEP-3; HE-1; NYS-1; BE-1; LP-1; WE-1)
 Herdis McCrary, Georgia (AP-2; UP-2; CEP-1; HE-3; INS-2; WE-2)
 Bill Amos, Washington & Jefferson (AP-3; CEP-2; HE-2; BE-3)
 Mike Miles, Princeton (NANA; NYS-2; BE-2; WE-3)
 Pat Wilson, Washington (LP-2)
 Biff Hoffman, Stanford (INS-3; LP-2)
 Lou Tesreau, Washington (UP-3)
 Frank Briante, NYU (CP-2)

Key
 Bold – Consensus All-American
 -1 – First-team selection
 -2 – Second-team selection
 -3 – Third-team selection
 CFHOF – College Football Hall of Fame

Official selectors
 AAB = All America Board
 AP = Associated Press
 COL = Collier's Weekly as selected by Grantland Rice with assistance from well-known coaches, including Glenn Warner, Robert Zuppke, Knute Rockne and Dan McGugin
 INS = International News Service selected by Davis Walsh, INS sports editor
 NEA = Newspaper Enterprise Association
 NANA = North American Newspaper Alliance
 UP = United Press, selected based on consensus among UP newspapers throughout the country and prominent football coaches

Other selectors
 BE = Billy Evans with the assistance of "100 of the leading football experts of the country"
 CP = Central Press Association, billed as the "Real" All-American team with selections based on fan input with cooperation from "hundreds of newspapers throughout the country"
 CEP = Charles E. Parker for the New York Evening Telegram
 HE = Hearst newspapers, consensus selection of more than 100 sports writers and editors at the Hearst newspapers
 LP = Lawrence Perry
 NYS = New York Sun "based on a canvas of 129 college teams throughout the country by the Sun's representatives" with gold watches being given to the members of the first eleven
 WC = Walter Camp Football Foundation
 WE = Walter Eckersall

See also
 1927 All-Big Ten Conference football team
 1927 All-Missouri Valley Conference football team
 1927 All-Pacific Coast Conference football team
 1927 All-Southern football team
 1927 All-Western college football team

References

All-America Team
College Football All-America Teams